The Jumbo River is a  tributary of the East Branch Ontonagon River in Iron and Houghton counties on the Upper Peninsula of Michigan in the United States. Via the East Branch, its waters flow north to the Ontonagon River and then to Lake Superior.

See also
List of rivers of Michigan

References

Michigan  Streamflow Data from the USGS

Rivers of Michigan
Rivers of Iron County, Michigan
Tributaries of Lake Superior